Lila Lalauni (9 June 1918 – 1996) was a Greek pianist and composer. She was born in Athens, the granddaughter of composer Timotheos Xanthopoulos. She studied piano at the Vienna Academy and then composition with Robert Konta. She made her debut as a concert pianist in Vienna in about 1930, and graduated from the academy in 1934. She continued her studies with Marcel Dupre in Paris, and became known internationally as a pianist. Her vision failed in her later life.

Works
Lalauni composed piano concertos, songs, chamber music and a symphony. Selected works include:
Syntheses et catalysis, symphony, 1960–62
Piano Concerto [No. 1], 1943
Piano Concerto [No. 2], 1959

References

1918 births
1996 deaths
20th-century classical composers
Women classical composers
Greek classical composers
Place of death missing
20th-century women composers
20th-century Greek musicians
Musicians from Athens